The 1975 season of the Montserrat Championship was the second season of top flight association football competition in Montserrat. Having won the cup final, known as the Barclays Knockout Trophy for sponsorship reasons, the previous season, Bata Falcons won the championship.

References

1975 domestic association football leagues
1975 in Montserrat
Montserrat Championship seasons